Nathan Lee Craig (born 25 October 1991) is a Welsh former footballer.

He has previously played for Premier League team Everton, Torquay United and his home town club, Caernarfon Town. He is also a Wales under-21 international. Craig is a left-footed midfielder who can play in both central or wide roles.

Club career

Everton
Craig joined Everton at the age of 12 and, having progressed through the youth team ranks, he was offered a place as a first-year scholar in the summer of 2008. A deadball specialist, he became a regular in the Under-18s during the 2008/09 season. His versatility down the left flank and set-piece delivery saw him progress to Everton's reserves in the 2009/2010 and he became a regular for the reserves during the 2010/2011 season. He made his competitive first-team debut versus BATE Borisov on 17 December 2009 in the UEFA Europa League.

Caernarfon Town
After being released by Everton in the summer of 2011, he joined up with home town club Caernarfon Town.

Torquay United
Craig Joined Torquay United after a successful trial in 2012 and went on to make 47 appearances, scoring 1 goal. Following the club's relegation to the Conference in May 2014 Craig, along with 7 other teammates, was placed on the transfer list. On 7 June 2014 following the player's request, his contract was mutually terminated.

Caernarfon Town
Recently he was reunited with his hometown club after leaving Torquay United. Craig has scored 14 goals in the first 18 games of the 16/17 season. This was followed by an excellent return of 21 goals in 26 games so far in 2017/2018. Craig scored 13 league goals as Caernarfon returned to the Welsh premier league in 18/19, with the team finishing an impressive 4th and qualifying for the Europa league play off.

On 22 June 2020, the club announced on Twitter that Craig had departed the club, for a “new challenge”, later revealed to be Flint Town United.

Craig later returned to Caernarfon appearing in only one match before moving to Porthmadog.

He announced his retirement in April 2022, citing injuries as the reason.

International career
Craig made a goalscoring debut for the Wales under-17 side on 27 August 2007 during a 2–1 victory over Belgium after replacing Matthew Hurdman as a first-half substitute. Two months after making his debut, Craig was included in the squad for the qualifying round of the 2008 UEFA European Under-17 Football Championship, making appearances in matches against Spain and Andorra. Having advanced to the elite round of qualifying, Craig played in all three group matches as Wales finished second in their group, failing to qualify for the tournament.

He made his debut for the Wales under-21 side against Bosnia and Herzegovina in October 2009.

Personal life
Craig was born in the town of Caernarfon in Wales and speaks fluent Welsh and English. His father is Caernarfon's number 1 limo driver Gerald Craig. His Cousin Osian is famous for his prowess on the local Gwynant climb.

References

http://www.thisissouthdevon.co.uk/DEVON-DERBY-COUNTDOWN-Torquay-United-s-Nathan/story-16848352-detail/story.html#axzz2MDlrWZbX
http://www.thisissouthdevon.co.uk/Booking-cramped-Nathan-Craig-s-combative-style/story-16893794-detail/story.html#axzz2MDlrWZbX

External links

evertonfc.com profile
FAW Trust profile

1991 births
Living people
People from Caernarfon
Sportspeople from Gwynedd
Welsh footballers
Wales under-21 international footballers
Wales youth international footballers
Association football midfielders
Everton F.C. players
Caernarfon Town F.C. players
Torquay United F.C. players
Dorchester Town F.C. players
English Football League players
Cymru Alliance players
Flint Town United F.C. players
Porthmadog F.C. players
Cymru North players